Agrippina Landing at Brundisium with the Ashes of Germanicus is a 1768 painting by Anglo-American artist Benjamin West, depicting widow Agrippina the Elder arriving at Brundisium with the ashes of her husband Germanicus to perform the last rites. The likeness of Agrippina and her children are based on the frieze of the Ara Pacis Augustae in which the family is depicted. The temples in the background are inspired by those from the Ruins of the Emperor Diocletian's Palace at Spalato (1764) by Robert Adam.

Context
Germanicus was the intended heir of his adoptive father Tiberius, the second emperor of Rome. He had been sent to look after the eastern provinces of the empire where he came into dispute with Gnaeus Calpurnius Piso, the governor of Syria. Germanicus became ill during the dispute and died on 10 October AD 19 in Antioch. Poison was suspected by many, and a trial was held during which Piso committed suicide.

After Germanicus' cremation in the forum of Antioch, Agrippina personally carried the ashes of her husband to Rome. The transportation of the ashes witnessed national mourning. She landed at the port of Brundisium in southern Italy where she was met with huge crowds of sympathizers; a praetorian escort was provided by the emperor in light of her rank as the wife of a governor-general. As she passed each town, the people and local magistrates came out to show their respect. Drusus the Younger (son of Tiberius), Claudius, and the consuls journeyed to join the procession as well. Once she made it to Rome, her husband's ashes were interred at the Mausoleum of Augustus.

As a famous general, he was widely popular and regarded as the ideal Roman long after his death. Primary sources (incl. Suetonius and Tacitus) often compared him to great men like Alexander the Great and hailed his qualities, contrasting them with the "tyrannical" qualities of Tiberius. Agrippina continued to show devotion to Germanicus after his death. Historian Lindsay Powell says she was regarded by the Roman people as, quoting Tacitus, "the glory of the country, the sole surviving offspring of Augustus, the solitary example of the good old times."

Description
Agrippina Landing in Brundisium with the Ashes of Germanicus is a 64 x 94 oil on canvas painting. West's painting depicts the events from the beginning of Tacitus' third book as read to him by his client, the Archbishop of York, Dr. Robert Drummond. She has just arrived in Italy with her children, holding the ashes of her husband the assassinated hero of the Roman Republic. She takes her place in front of the crowd of mourners to lead the procession. Agrippina's likeness is derived from classical friezes found on the Ara Pacis Augustae and other various funeral steles. She was to embody civic virtue and self-restraint.

West meticulously arranges the buildings in the painting's background to recall those of Robert Adam's Ruins of the Palace of the Emperor Diocletian, at Spalato, in Dalmatia, publicized only a few years prior with funding by the Society of Dilettanti. Robert Adam was an archaeologist who visited the site of Diocletian's Palace to study the architecture in-person and recreate it.

History
Dr. Drummond read Tacitus to West over dinner one evening with his own commentary on events, which West depicted in his work. West was enthused for the project as he himself was a neoclassicist. The work was unveiled in 1768 to great approval from King George III. This occurs during a propaganda war in the royal court between members with influence over the king's mother, Princess Augusta, to which the work owes its sudden popularity. Agrippina publicly draws analogies between the grieving widow at Brundisium and the mother of King George III. Agrippina's grief at Brundisium was an obscure story in the history of art before this.

The historical precision of Agrippina impressed King George III enough he commissioned West for a painting himself (The Departure of Regulus from Rome). The work would eventually find a place in the Royal Academy's inaugural exhibition in 1769. West would continue producing paintings for the king over the coming years, numbering some sixty in all.

Agrippina was a renowned model of noble grief in eighteenth-century neoclassical art. Conventions changed going into the Victorian period, however, with more expressive renderings of grief coming into vogue than that established by West.

The painting was later gifted to Yale University Art Gallery by Louis M. Rabinowitz where it remains today.

Footnotes

References

Sources
 
 
 
 
 
 
 
 
 
 

Paintings by Benjamin West
1768 paintings
Paintings about death
Paintings based on works by Tacitus
Works based on the Annals (Tacitus)